Khuất Văn Khang (born May 11, 2003) is a Vietnamese professional footballer who plays as an attacking midfielder for Viettel and the Vietnam national team.

Văn Khang signed for Viettel in 2013 and made his professional debut for them in the V.League 1 in October 2022.

Having represented Vietnam at under-15, under-16, under-20 and under-23 levels, Văn Khang made his senior debut for Vietnam in September 2022.

Playing career 
In 2013, Khuất Văn Khang started his career as a player at the training system of Viettel. In 2017, Văn Khang and Vietnam U15 won the championship 2017 AFF U-15 Championship.

In 2018, at 2018 AFC U-16 Championship, although U-16 Vietnam was eliminated from the group stage, but Văn Khang still left a mark with a best goal from free kick against U-16 Indonesia.

Khuất Văn Khang debuts U-23 Vietnam in a 2–2 draw against U-23 Thailand at 2022 AFC U-23 Asian Cup. In the match against U-23 Korea Republic after that, Văn Khang and the whole team created "seismic" when his team was able to draw the opponent, he was also personally rated as man of the match.

Career statistics

International goals

U-15 Vietnam

U-16 Vietnam

U-19 Vietnam

Vietnam

Honours
Vietnam U15
 AFF U-15 Youth Championship: 2017
Vietnam U19
 AFF U-19 Youth Championship: Third place: 2022
 International U-19 Thanh Niên Newspaper Cup: 2022
Vietnam
VFF Cup: 2022

References 

Living people
2003 births
Vietnamese footballers
Association football midfielders
Viettel FC players
Sportspeople from Hanoi
21st-century Vietnamese people